Paul Tessier (born 26 August 1961) is a Canadian rowing coxswain. He competed in the men's coxed four event at the 1984 Summer Olympics.

References

External links
 

1961 births
Living people
Canadian male rowers
Olympic rowers of Canada
Rowers at the 1984 Summer Olympics
Sportspeople from Regina, Saskatchewan
Coxswains (rowing)
Pan American Games medalists in rowing
Pan American Games bronze medalists for Canada
Rowers at the 1983 Pan American Games
Medalists at the 1983 Pan American Games